Seeking the Soul (foaled May 4, 2013) is a retired American Thoroughbred racehorse owned by Canadian geologist Charles Fipke whose most important win came in the 2017 Grage 1 Clark Handicap.

Career
On February 20, 2016, Seeking the Soul debuted at the Fair Grounds Race Course, coming in second place.

Although he had mixed results in smaller races throughout 2016 and 2017, while competing in an allowance race at Keeneland on October 21, 2017, Seeking the Soul set a new track record of 1:41.36 for a mile and one-sixteenth on dirt. A month later, on November 24, he won the Grade 1 Clark Handicap  2017 

His next major win came on September 29, 2018 at the Ack Ack Stakes. 

Seeking the Soul finished second in both the 2018 Breeders' Cup Dirt Mile and the 2019 Pegasus World Cup.

On June 15, 2019, he won the 2019 Stephen Foster Handicap and was ranked 3rd on the North American Thoroughbred Racing Starters Earnings Leaderboard in August 2019.

Pedigree

References

2013 racehorse births
Thoroughbred racehorses
Racehorses bred in Kentucky
Racehorses trained in the United States
Horse racing track record setters
American racehorses
Thoroughbred family 6-a